Ski jumping at the 1960 Winter Olympics consisted of one event held on 28 February, taking place at Papoose Peak Jumps.

The competition scheduled two jumps per entrant. Standings were determined by a point system under the parameters of combined distance points and "style" points awarded for each attempt, judged by a panel of 5 officials. This event marked the first time the Däscher Technique was used in ski jumping competitions.

Medal summary

Medal table

Events

Results

Participating NOCs
Fifteen nations participated in ski jumping at the Squaw Valley Games.

References

 
1960 Winter Olympics events
1960
1960 in ski jumping
Ski jumping competitions in the United States